Giovanni Gozzadini (15 October 1810 – 25 August 1887) was an Italian archeologist.

The last male heir of a noble family in Bologna, that had given the city men-at-arms, doctors, and jurists, Giovanni was a highly educated man in other areas such as politics. His excavations in a necropolis on his property at Villanova (Castenaso, eight kilometers south-east of Bologna), lasting from 1853 to 1855, involved 193 tombs, six of which were separated from the rest as if to signify a special social status. The "well tomb" pit graves lined with stones contained funerary urns. Thus were unearthed the first remains of the Villanovan culture, the first Iron Age culture in ancient Italy. The name Villanovan derives from that of the estate owned by Gozzadini.

He also undertook the first excavations that brought to light the Etruscan necropolis at Marzabotto, financed by the conti Aria, who were the landowners of the entire Pianura di Misano.

He is also known for his ground-breaking study of the medieval Towers of Bologna.
 
At her death, his only daughter, Gozzadina Gozzadini left the family fortune to the Hospital of Bologna, where the university pediatric clinic carries the family name today, the Clinica Pediatrica Universitaria Gozzadini di Bologna.

References

External links
 

People from Bologna
Italian archaeologists
1810 births
1887 deaths
Members of the Senate of the Kingdom of Italy
Members of the Senate of the Kingdom of Sardinia
Villanovan culture